21.00: Eros Live World Tour 2009/2010 is a live album by Italian singer-songwriter Eros Ramazzotti, released by RCA Records on 30 November 2010.

The main edition of the album is composed of two Compact Discs, featuring twenty-six songs recorded live during the 2009-2010 tour promoting the album Ali e radici. The Special Edition of the album also includes a DVD, featuring the documentary Appunti e note di un viaggio, directed by Paolo Zambaldi. The album was also released in a DVD-only edition and in a limited 3-LPs edition.

Track listing

Charts and certifications

Peak positions

Year-end charts

Certifications

Personnel
Credits adapted from Allmusic.
Music credits

 Sara Bellantoni – background vocals
 Luca Colombo – guitar
 Diego Corradin – drums
 Romina Falconi – background vocals
 Claudio Guidetti – guitar, vocals
 Reggie Hamilton – bass
 Everette Harp – saxophone
 Michael Landau – guitar
 Gary Novak – drums
 Nicola Peruch – keyboards
 Eros Ramazzotti – vocals
 Luca Scarpa – keyboards, piano
 Giorgio Secco – guitar
 Chiara Vergati – background vocals

Production credits

 Sara Benmessaoud – photography
 Michele Canova Iorfida – producer
 Pino "Pinaxa" Pischetola – mixing
 Eros Ramazzotti – producer
 Flora Sala – cover design
 Pat Simonini – assistant, digital editing
 Max Tommasini – assistant
 Paolo Zambaldi – photography

Notes

2010 live albums
Eros Ramazzotti live albums
Sony Music Italy live albums
RCA Records live albums
Italian-language live albums